The 137th Airlift Squadron (137 AS) is a unit of the New York Air National Guard 105th Airlift Wing located at Stewart Air National Guard Base, Newburgh, New York. The 137th is equipped with the C-17A Globemaster III.

History

World War II
The squadron was originally formed as the 483rd Bombardment Squadron (Dive) at Hunter Army Airfield, Georgia, as a Third Air Force Operational Training Unit, equipped with Douglas A-24 Banshee dive bombers. It moved to California in September 1943 to join the Desert Training Center in the Mojave Desert.

After the A-24 was taken out of service, trained with P-39 Airacobras and became combat ready, being reassigned to VIII Fighter Command in England, April 1944. Re-equipped with P-51 Mustangs, with a mission for escorting B-17 Flying Fortress and B-24 Liberator heavy bombers during its first five weeks of operations, and afterwards flew many escort missions to cover the operations of medium and heavy bombers that struck strategic objectives, interdicted the enemy's communications, or supported operations on the ground.

The group frequently strafed airfields and other targets of opportunity while on escort missions. Provided fighter cover over the English Channel and the coast of Normandy during the Normandy landings of June 1944. Strafed and dive-bombed vehicles, locomotives, marshaling yards, anti-aircraft batteries, and troops while Allied forces fought to break out of the beachhead in France. Attacked transportation targets as Allied armies drove across France after the breakthrough at Saint-Lô in July. Flew area patrols during the "Operation Market-Garden" airborne landings on the Netherlands in September. Escorted bombers to, and flew patrols over the battle area during the German counterattack in the Ardennes (Battle of the Bulge), December 1944 – January 1945. Provided area patrols during the assault across the Rhine in March 1945.

Returned to the US in October and inactivated on 18 October 1945 as an administrative unit.

New York Air National Guard
The wartime 504th Fighter Squadron was re-designated as the 137th Fighter Squadron, and was allotted to the New York Air National Guard, on 24 May 1946. It was organized at Westchester County Airport, White Plains, New York, and was extended federal recognition on 8 December 1948 by the National Guard Bureau. The 137th Fighter Squadron was bestowed the lineage, history, honors, and colors of the 504th Fighter Squadron and all predecessor units. The squadron was equipped with F-47D Thunderbolts and was assigned to the New York ANG 107th Fighter Group.

The mission of the 136th Fighter Squadron was the air defense of Southeast New York and New York City. Aircraft parts were no problem and many of the maintenance personnel were World War II veterans so readiness was quite high and the planes were often much better maintained than their USAF counterparts. In some ways, the postwar Air National Guard was almost like a flying country club and a pilot could often show up at the field, check out an aircraft and go flying. However, the unit also had regular military exercises that kept up proficiency and in gunnery and bombing contests they would often score at least as well or better than active-duty USAF units, given the fact that most ANG pilots were World War II combat veterans.

Air defense mission
With the surprise invasion of South Korea on 25 June 1950, and the regular military's complete lack of readiness, most of the Air National Guard was federalized placed on active duty.  The 137th was retained by the State of New York to maintain the air defense mission primarily of New York City.   In 1951, the Thunderbolts were replaced by Very Long Range F-51H Mustangs with were capable of extended air defense flights over all of New York State.

The air defense mission remained after the Korean War armistice and the unit resumed normal peacetime training and drills. In 1954, the Mustang was ending its service life and Air Defense Command was re-equipping its fighter-interceptor squadrons with jet aircraft. The 137th received F-94B Starfires, however the F-94 required a two-man aircrew a pilot and an air observer to operate its radar equipment. Trainees for the radar assignment had to attend regular Air Force Training Schools, and required virtually the same qualifications as the pilot trainees. The additional recruitment of guardsmen led to the units having a manning and capabilities problem that lasted for some time until the unit was returned to full readiness.

In 1956, the 107th Fighter-Interceptor Wing was reorganized and re-designated as the 107th Air Defense Wing.  As a result, the 137th was authorized to expand to a group level, and the 105th Fighter Group (Air Defense) was established by the National Guard Bureau. The 137th TFS becoming the group's flying squadron. Other squadrons assigned into the group were the 105th Headquarters, 105th Material Squadron (Maintenance), 105th Combat Support Squadron, and the 105th USAF Dispensary.  The F-86H Sabre replaced the F-94B Starfires in 1957.

A major change to the 107th Air Defense Wing in 1958 was the transition from an Air Defense Command (ADC) mission to Tactical Air Command (TAC) and a tactical fighter mission, the 105th being re-designated as a Tactical Fighter Group; and 137th also being re-designated. The new assignment involved a change in the Group's training mission to include high-altitude interception, air-to-ground rocketry, ground strafing and tactical bombing. The 137th TFS retained their F-86H Sabres.

Airlift mission
The 105th Tactical Fighter Group was inactivated on 1 February 1961 with the 137th being transferred to the 106th Aeromedical Transport Group on 1 February 1961 and was re-designated as the 137th Aeromedical Transport Squadron under the Military Air Transport Service (MATS). The 137th converted to flying the C-119 Flying Boxcar.   The squadron airlifted critically injured and sick personnel until late 1963.

With air transportation recognized as a critical need, the 137th was re-designated the 137th Air Transport Squadron (Heavy) 1 December 1963 and equipped with C-97 Stratofreighter heavy transports, although the Aeromedical Flight remained as a secondary mission.  With the C-97s, the 102d augmented MATS airlift capability worldwide in support of the Air Force's needs in Europe. It also flew scheduled MATS transport missions to Europe, Africa the Caribbean and South America.  On 8 January 1966, Military Air Transport Service became Military Airlift Command (MAC) and the 137th was re-designated as the 137th Military Airlift Squadron.

In 1966, the squadron began operations to and from bases in South Vietnam.  During calendar year 1967, in addition to the Southeast Asia flights which continued throughout the year until September, the squadron flew missions to South America, Africa, Australia, Asia and Europe in support of the Military Airlift Command and the Joint Chiefs of Staff airlift (directed) missions. The overseas flights also were in addition to a variety of airlift missions flown within the continental United States to include Alaska, Hawaii and Puerto Rico carrying personnel of the active military, Reserve and National Guard units to and from training sites and a continuing series of joint exercises.

Forward air support mission
In 1969 the C-97s were reaching the end of their operational lifetime and in March, the 105th changed again to become the 105th Tactical Air Support Group and became part of Tactical Air Command. The 137th received interim Cessna U-3 aircraft which was shortly replaced with the O-2A Super Skymaster direct from Cessna.   The O-2 was the military version of the Cessna 337 Skymaster, a high wing, twin boom aircraft with a unique centerline pusher/tractor twin engine configuration. The O-2A version, used by the 137th TASS, was used in forward air control, (FAC), missions, often in conjunction with a ground FAC & ROMAD, (radio operator, maintenance, and driver), team.

The mission of the 105th Tactical Air Support Group was to train Forward Air Controllers and to maintain proficiency in the unit aircraft.  An unusual highlight of 1970 was the call to active duty on 24, 25 and 26 March for the New York City Postal Strike, U.S. Post Office workers went off the job in a pay dispute, and President Richard Nixon called on New York City area Guardsmen to sort and deliver the mail. The 105th performed its postal duties at the Main Bronx Post Office, Westchester County Airport.  The NYANG ramp continued to be the "entrance of choice" by foreign dignitaries, and President Nixon during 1970. The Presidents of France, Ecuador, and several other foreign notables landed there on visits to the U.S. President Nixon arrived there during his campaign for Republican Congressmen in the fall.

During this time, the unit received the Air Force Outstanding Unit Award. After becoming a part of the Tactical Air Command, the unit received the New York State Governor's Trophy, as the State's outstanding flying unit, more than one half of the years.

As part of the draw-down of forces in Southeast Asia, aircraft from the Vietnam War were added to make up the allocated number to the Group.   However, the 105th had to actually rebuild most of the Vietnam Veteran aircraft, which had been through the most rigorous of combat operations in South Vietnam. The 105th made national news through their program of assisting local governmental health agencies in the detection of violations of water and stream pollution laws. 105th pilots, on the kind of observation missions they would be doing in combat, initiated a program of photography and reporting to local civic
officials. The local health agency would then send its own aircraft up to take similar photographs for
evidence and possible action.  The 105th was awarded the Governor's Trophy for 1974, signifying the outstanding flying unit of the New York Air National Guard for that year.

The 105th was upgraded to a Wing on 14 June 1975, the group becoming the operational organization for the new wing organization. In August 1978 the group was inactivated with the 137th TASS being assigned directly to the Wing.  However, the unit reverted to Group status on 1 July 1979, when the Wing organization was transferred to the 174th Tactical Fighter Group to accommodate the newly organized A-10 Thunderbolt II Wing.

In 1981, the group deployed to Lechfeld Air Base, West Germany to observe A-10 Close Air Support operations, and forward air control in the NATO/USAFE environment. The visit provided a first-hand look at tactics used by various NATO members, as well as an in-depth look at Forward Operating locations and NATO air tasking orders.

In the early 1980s, it became apparent that the facility at Westchester Airport was not large enough to support a conversion to a new aircraft or mission. The State's Division of Military and Naval Affairs started negotiations with National Guard Bureau to relocate the unit. As a result, USAF and the Air National Guard approved a unit relocation to Stewart International Airport, Newburgh, New York. This move took advantage of the excellent airfield facilities at Stewart, which was an active Air Force Base through 1969.  The move, initiated during 1982 was completed by the last quarter of 1983.

Strategic airlift

In May 1983, the unit relocated to Stewart International Airport. It was re-designated the 105th Military Airlift Group on 1 May 1984 and later in July 1985 became the first Air National Guard unit in the Nation to fly the C-5A Galaxy aircraft.  Soon after receiving its first C-5A aircraft, in October 1985 the unit airlifted 84,600 pounds of cots and bedding to Puerto Rico following Hurricane Gloria.

In October 1988 the 105th airlifted 300,000 pounds of hurricane relief and reconstruction supplies to the island nation of Jamaica following Hurricane Gilbert. In January 1989 the unit carried 146,610 pounds of earthquake relief supplies to aid Soviet Armenia. In March 1989 the 105th responded with less than 24 hours notice to an AMC request to airlift an over 80,000 pound submersible vehicle from Andrews AFB, Maryland and Homestead AFB, Florida to Kadena AB, Japan to assist in search and recovery operations for an Air Force Sikorsky SH-3 Sea King helicopter which crashed in the East China Sea. Throughout the summer and fall of 1989 the 105th continued to support reconstruction efforts in Jamaica by airlifting National Guard civil engineering teams and equipment to that island nation.

Beginning in October 1989 the unit airlifted over 2,000,000 pounds of relief supplies to Puerto Rico and the Virgin Islands following Hurricane Hugo. In December 1991 the 105th airlifted over 145,000 pounds of clothing, blankets and medical supplies to Bucharest, Romania. In February 1992 the unit participated in Operation Provide Hope, the airlift of humanitarian aid to the Commonwealth of Independent States (former Soviet Union); delivering 384,000 pounds of relief materials to Saint Petersburg, Russia and Yerevan, Armenia.

1989 ended on a dramatic note for the 105th Airlift Wing as it performed its wartime mission in support of Operation Just Cause. The over 2,200,000 pounds of cargo airlifted by the 105th in support of that operation represented approximately 25% of the initial total airlift effort of all of the Military Airlift Command's C-5 fleet assigned to both active duty and reserve component elements.

On 7 August 1990 Governor Mario Cuomo announced that the Department of Defense had requested, and he had approved, the participation of the personnel and C-5A aircraft of the 105th in active and direct support of Operation Desert Shield in the Persian Gulf region. On 24 August the 137th Military Airlift Squadron was called to active duty by President George H. W. Bush to provide continued support for this operation. While the 137th was formally returned to state control on 15 May 1991, the majority of unit members chose to remain in active status until 1 August 1991 in response to the Military Airlift Command's need for continuing airlift support of Operation Desert Storm and Operation Provide Comfort (Kurdish relief).

On 28 February 1991, a part of the 105th USAF Clinic was also called to active duty with duty stations at Malcolm Grow Medical Center, Andrews AFB, Maryland. All medical personnel were released from active duty during May 1991.

In March 1992, with the end of the Cold War, the 105th adopted the Air Force Objective Organization plan, and the unit was re-designated as the 105th Airlift Group. On 1 October 1995, in accordance with the Air Force "One Base – One Wing" policy, the 105th Airlift Wing was established and the 137th Airlift Squadron was assigned to the new 105th Operations Group.

In September 1992 the unit responded to Hurricane Andrew; delivering 1,289,953 pounds of food, tents, mobile kitchens, vehicles, and emergency services personnel to the Homestead area of South Florida. In November 1992 the 105th airlifted 118,450 pounds—including generators, portable shelters and medical supplies and equipment—to Zagreb, Croatia to support the U.S. Army's 212th Mobile Army Surgical Hospital's establishment of a facility to provide a full range of health care for United Nations forces deployed in Croatia and Bosnia-Herzegovina. From December 1992 to April 1993 the 105th supported Operation Restore Hope providing humanitarian airlift of 2,800,000 pounds of supplies and over 600 passengers into Somalia. Following massive flooding in the central United States in July 1993, the unit airlifted, to Des Moines, Iowa; ten reverse osmosis water purification systems weighing a total of over 380,000 pounds and capable of providing over 600,000 gallons of potable water a day. In August 1993 the unit airlifted 75 tons of relief supplies and equipment to Southern Turkey to be used to help Kurdish refugees from Iraqi terrorism.

In October 1993 the 105th returned to Somalia, delivering military personnel and almost 860,000 pounds of equipment non-stop—with triple air refueling—directly from bases in the United States to Mogadishu. In July 1994 105th aircraft began carrying humanitarian relief supplies to the people of Rwanda—by early September 1,635,189 pounds of supplies and equipment were delivered to East Africa. In late September 1994 the unit began airlifting over a million pounds of supplies and equipment to Haiti as part of Operation Uphold Democracy. The 105th played a key role in July 1995 for Operation Quick Lift when it airlifted 431,000 pounds of cargo and 190 British troops from RAF Brize Norton, UK to Split Croatia in support of the United Nations' Rapid Reaction Deployment Force.

In October 1994 105th aircraft and volunteer crews played a key role in Operation Vigilant Warrior and Operation Southern Watch deterring potential Iraqi aggression in the Arabian Peninsula. In August 1995 the 105th played a key role in airlifting personnel and equipment to Kuwait in support of Operation Vigilant Warrior II and Exercise Intrinsic Action.

Immediately following Hurricane Marilyn in September 1995, the unit airlifted 527,200 pounds of desperately needed supplies and equipment to the citizens of the American Virgin Islands.

In December 1995, 105th Airlift Wing C-5 crews embarked on the first of six missions in support of President Clinton's peacekeeping mission in Bosnia, transporting almost 800,000 pounds of U.S. Army support equipment to the European theater.  The 105th returned to the East African country of Rwanda in March 1996 to deliver 120,000 pounds of vital supplies and equipment in support of the Rwandan War Crimes Tribunal and the World Food Program.

In mid-1996, the Air Force, in response to budget cuts, and changing world situations, began experimenting with Air Expeditionary organizations. The Air Expeditionary Force (AEF) concept was developed that would mix Active-Duty, Reserve and Air National Guard elements into a combined force. Instead of entire permanent units deploying as "Provisional" as in the 1991 Gulf War, Expeditionary units are composed of "aviation packages" from several wings, including active-duty Air Force, the Air Force Reserve Command and the Air National Guard, would be married together to carry out the assigned deployment rotation.

Since 1996, the 137th Expeditionary Airlift Squadron was formed and deployed in support of world contingencies including Operation Joint Endeavor, Operation Allied Force, and Operation Joint Guardian.    After the 9/11 terrorist attacks in 2001, the 137th EAS was formed and activated to support Operation Northern Watch, Operation Enduring Freedom and Operation Iraqi Freedom.

Modern era

On 27 November 2010, the USAF selected the New York Air National Guard's 105th Airlift Wing at Stewart Air National Guard Base as its "preferred base" for eight C-17 Globemaster III aircraft. The 12 C-5A Galaxy operated by the 105th AW were retired and replaced by the C-17s.   The last 105th Airlift Wing based C-5A Galaxy, tail number 0001, departed its Hudson Valley home for the last time on 19 September 2012.

The initial C-17 assigned to Stewart AGB, tail number 50105, arrived on 18 July 2011. The 105th AW C-17 rollout ceremony was held 6 August 2011 with two C-17s being placed on display during the event, the first of eight which replaced the larger, aging C-5A fleet.  Unlike its predecessor, the C-17 can take off and land from unpaved runways.

In the aftermath of Hurricane Sandy in October 2012, the 105th Airlift Wing and the 213d Engineering Installation Squadron deployed 75 New York ANG Airmen as part of the state response to the disaster in New York City and Long Island. The Airmen were part of Joint Operations Area 3, Joint Task Force 3 hurricane relief operations in Manhattan and were among more than 2,400 Army and ANG service members deployed at the order of Gov. Andrew M. Cuomo.

Lineage

 Constituted 483d Bombardment Squadron (Dive) on 3 August 1942
 Activated on 10 August 1942
 Re-designated: 504th Fighter-Bomber Squadron on 10 August 1943
 Re-designated: 504th Fighter Squadron on 30 May 1944
 Inactivated on 7 November 1945
 Re-designated 137th Fighter Squadron, and allotted to New York ANG, on 24 May 1946.
 Received federal recognition and activated on 8 December 1948
 Re-designated: 137th Fighter-Interceptor Squadron, 1 December 1952
 Re-designated: 137th Tactical Fighter Squadron, 10 November 1958
 Re-designated: 137th Aeromedical Transport Squadron, 27 January 1961
 Re-designated: 137th Air Transport Squadron, 1 December 1963
 Re-designated: 137th Military Airlift Squadron, 8 January 1966
 Re-designated: 137th Tactical Air Support Squadron, 1 May 1969
 Re-designated: 137th Military Airlift Squadron, 1 May 1984
 Federalized and ordered to active service on: 24 August 1990
 Released from active duty and returned to New York state control, 1 August 1991
 Re-designated: 137th Airlift Squadron, 18 March 1992
 Components designated as: 137th Expeditionary Airlift Squadron when deployed as part of an Air and Space Expeditionary unit after June 1996.

Assignments
 339th Bombardment (later Fighter Fighter-Bomber; Fighter) Group, 10 August 1942 – 18 October 1945
 107th Fighter Group, 8 December 1948
 107th Fighter-Interceptor Group, 1 December 1952
 105th Fighter Group (Air Defense), 1 May 1956
 105th Tactical Fighter Group, 10 November 1958
 106th Aeromedical Transport Group, 1 February 1961
 105th Air Transport Group, 1 December 1953
 105th Military Airlift Group, 8 January 1966
 105th Tactical Air Support Group, 1 May 1969
 105th Tactical Air Support Wing, 1 August 1978
 105th Tactical Air Support Group, 1 July 1979
 105th Military Airlift Group, 1 May 1984
 105th Airlift Group, 18 March 1992
 105th Operations Group, 1 October 1995

Stations
 Hunter Field, Georgia, 10 August 1942
 Drew Field, Florida, February 1943
 Walterboro Army Airfield, South Carolina, July 1943
 Rice Army Airfield, California, 1 September 1943— March 1944
 RAF Fowlmere (USAAF Station 378), England, 4 April 1944— October 1945
 Camp Kilmer, New Jersey, C. 16–18 October 1945
 Westchester County Airport, White Plains, New York, 8 December 1948
 Stewart International Airport, Newburgh, New York, 1 May 1983
 Designated: Stewart Air National Guard Base, 1991–Present

Aircraft

 A-24 Banshee, 1942–1943
 P-39 Airacobra, 1943–1944
 P-51D Mustang, 1944–1945
 F-47D Thunderbolt, 1948–1951
 F-51H Mustang, 1951–1954
 F-94B Starfire, 1954–1957
 F-86H Sabre, 1957–1961

 MC-119J Flying Boxcar, 1961–1963
 C-97 Stratofreighter, 1963–1969
 U-3A/B Blue Canoe, 1969–1971
 O-2 Skymaster, 1971–1984
 C-5A Galaxy, 1984–2012
 C-17 Globemaster III, 2011–present

References

 Maurer, Maurer. Combat Squadrons of the Air Force: World War II. Maxwell Air Force Base, Alabama: Office of Air Force History, 1982.
 Rogers, B. (2006). United States Air Force Unit Designations Since 1978. 
  Cornett, Lloyd H. and Johnson, Mildred W., A Handbook of Aerospace Defense Organization  1946–1980, Office of History, Aerospace Defense Center, Peterson AFB, CO (1980).
 History of the 105th Airlift Wing
 105th Tactical Air Support Group History 
 New York Department of Military Affairs Adjutant General Reports, 1846–1988

External links

Squadrons of the United States Air National Guard
0137
Military units and formations in New York (state)